979 Ilsewa (prov. designation:  or ) is a background asteroid from the outer regions of the asteroid belt, approximately  in diameter. It was discovered by German astronomer Karl Reinmuth at the Heidelberg-Königstuhl State Observatory on 29 June 1922. The uncommon T-type asteroid has a longer-than average rotation period of 42.6 hours. It was named after , an acquaintance of the discoverer.

Orbit and classification 

Ilsewa is a non-family asteroid of the main belt's background population when applying the hierarchical clustering method to its proper orbital elements. It orbits the Sun in the outer asteroid belt at a distance of 2.7–3.6 AU once every 5 years and 7 months (2,050 days; semi-major axis of 3.16 AU). Its orbit has an eccentricity of 0.14 and an inclination of 10° with respect to the ecliptic. The body's observation arc begins at Heidelberg in September 1922, three months after its official discovery observation.

Naming 

This minor planet was named after , an acquaintance of the discoverer. The naming was mentioned in The Names of the Minor Planets by Paul Herget in 1955.

Physical characteristics 
In both the Tholen- and SMASS-like taxonomy of the Small Solar System Objects Spectroscopic Survey (S3OS2), Ilsewa is an uncommon T-type asteroid, part of the overall larger C-complex of carbonaceous asteroids.

Rotation period and poles 

In August 2012, a rotational lightcurve of Ilsewa was obtained from photometric observations by Robert Stephens at the Santana Observatory . Additional observations were taken at the Center for Solar System Studies . Lightcurve analysis gave a rotation period of  hours with a brightness variation of  magnitude. Andrea Ferrero at Bigmuskie Observatory  determined a concurring period of  hours and an amplitude of  magnitude.

A modeled lightcurve using photometric data from the Lowell Photometric Database was published in 2016. It gave a sidereal period of 42.8982 hours, as well as a spin axis at (352.0°, −66.0°) in ecliptic coordinates (λ, β).

Diameter and albedo 

According to the survey carried out by the Infrared Astronomical Satellite IRAS, the Japanese Akari satellite, and the NEOWISE mission of NASA's Wide-field Infrared Survey Explorer, Ilsewa measures between 35.7 and 38.8 kilometers in diameter and its surface has an albedo between 0.14 and 0.17. The Collaborative Asteroid Lightcurve Link derives an albedo of 0.1707 and calculates a diameter of 36.93 kilometers, based on an absolute magnitude of 9.7.

References

External links 
 Lightcurve Database Query (LCDB), at www.minorplanet.info
 Dictionary of Minor Planet Names, Google books
 Discovery Circumstances: Numbered Minor Planets (1)-(5000) – Minor Planet Center
 
 

000979
Discoveries by Karl Wilhelm Reinmuth
Named minor planets
19220629